James Johnstone Barnet, (1827 in Almericlose, Arbroath, Scotland – 16 December 1904 in Forest Lodge, Sydney, New South Wales) was the Colonial Architect for Colonial New South Wales, serving from 1862 to 1890.

Early life
Born the son of a builder, Barnet was educated at the local high school. In 1843, at the age of sixteen, Barnet moved to London, where he became a builder's apprentice, studying drawing under William Dyce RA and architecture with CJ Richardson FRIBA.  He then became of clerk of works with the Worshipful Company of Fishmongers.  In 1854 he married and sailed for Sydney, Australia, with his new wife, Rosa. In Sydney, he worked first as a builder for Edmund Blacket, then became Clerk of Works at the University of Sydney.

Colonial architect
In 1860, he joined the Colonial Architect's Office. In 1862, he was acting head of the office; in 1865, he was promoted to the post of Colonial Architect. He held that position for twenty-five years until the Office was reorganised in 1890.

In that period the department built 169 post and telegraph offices, 130 courthouses, 155 police stations, 110 lock-ups, 20 lighthouses and many other types of buildings. His major works include the General Post Office building in Sydney, Callan Park Lunatic Asylum, the Australian Museum, the Colonial Secretary's building, Lands Department building, and the Anderson Stuart Building at Sydney University.

Major projects 
Some major works completed by Barnet include:
Defence works at Botany Bay, Port Jackson and Newcastle
Court houses, lock-ups, police stations and post offices throughout New South Wales (see Court houses in New South Wales)
Lighthouses, including rebuilding the Macquarie Lighthouse first built by Francis Greenway, Smoky Cape Lighthouse at South West Rocks, Sugarloaf Point Light Station at Seal Rocks, Barranjoey Head at Palm Beach, Green Cape at Eden and the similarly designed five lighthouses, Richmond River Light, Clarence River Light, Tacking Point Lighthouse, Crowdy Head Light and Fingal Head Light, built in 1878-1880.

Major Sydney public buildings 
Major public buildings in Sydney by Barnet include:

 Australian Museum (new wing)
 Colonial Secretary's Building
 Callan Park Lunatic Asylum
 Customs House
 Darlinghurst Court House
 Department of Lands building
 East Sydney Technical College
 General Post Office
 Medical School Anderson Stuart building at the University of Sydney
 Mortuary Station, Central Railway
 Mortuary Station, Rookwood
 North Sydney Post Office (opened 1889 as St Leonards PO, renamed 1890)
 Parramatta Post Office
 Public Works Building
 State Library of New South Wales
 Traffic Court No. 2, Sydney
 Victoria Lodge, Botanical Gardens

The Colonial Architect's office was also responsible for maintenance of public buildings. Between 1865 and 1881, Barnet had supervised 1,490 projects. Other roles were assigned to Barnet: for example, he was put in charge of the arrangements for the visit of the Duke of Edinburgh in 1868.

Sydney International Exhibition building

In 1879, Barnet was put in charge of the design and erection of the Sydney International Exhibition building. The Colonial Architect's Office completed this large task in nine months, including preparing 412 drawings, management of the accounts and payments associated with the project, and supervision of the building. Night shifts were used to get through the project using the first electric light in Sydney. Although the project was judged a success at the end, Barnet was constantly criticised in Parliament during the construction. The project overran its budget of £50,000 by more than three times, costing £184,570.

Barnet had previously been criticised in 1874 over the new wing of the Australian Museum by the Museum's trustees and a select committee of the Legislative Assembly. By contrast, also in 1874, the first stage of his General Post Office in Martin Place received high praise, putting aside the much criticised carved figures in the arcade.

Defence buildings 
Between 1870 and 1889 Barnet was on the commission set up to plan the colony's defence. Barnet built new batteries and barracks. In July 1889, defence works became the responsibility of a military works branch of the Public Works Department. The new director was Lieutenant–Colonel F.R. de Wolski. De Wolski criticised Barnet's work. Barnet was not prompt in handing over plans and documents for defence works. There had been rumours about the project at Bare Island battery in Botany Bay. On 1 July 1890, a Royal Commission was set up to investigate the letting of contracts and report on the work completed. The evidence presented by staff of the Colonial Architect's office and Barnet was contradictory. The Commission found that the work was below standard and the Colonial Architect's supervision of the project was not adequate.  While the minister supported Barnet, the Commission's censure was a regrettable end to his distinguished career. Barnet resigned as Colonial Architect. He believed that de Wolski had significantly influenced the Commission and held that the Commission’s findings were unjust, petty and spiteful.

Architectural approach and legacy 
Barnet's work drew from a variety classical sources, sometimes with elements from specific buildings, with levels of elaboration or features that suited the function. For instance his courthouses often included a bold Neoclassical portico, while his post offices often featured a rustic Italianate clocktower, and both types of buildings often featured generous verandahs or arcaded loggias, shaded areas that suited the hot colonial climate. His larger works like the Sydney departmental buildings, the GPO, and the Garden Palace synthesised elements from various periods of the Italian Renaissance, as well as from English architects such as Christopher Wren and Charles Robert Cockerell, to create impressive compositions. When suitable he could also design in a lively Gothic Revival style, notably the two cemetery railway stations. Some later designs drew directly from the later Renaissance, from what we now call Mannerism and Baroque, notably Bathurst Gaol, the Central Police Court and the Rocks Police Station.

After his retirement in 1899 he published a short overview of architecture in his adopted colony, entitled Architectural work in Sydney, New South Wales, 1788-1899.

He had little time for the new styles of architecture becoming fashionable in Sydney at the end of the nineteenth century, particularly those that followed American trends. Barnet was also critical of domestic architectural fashions, cluttered with what he saw as useless ornamentation, and "surmounted with blazing red tiles from France."

Personal life 
Barnet died in 1904 and is buried in the Presbyterian section of Rookwood Cemetery. His wife had died in 1890. He was survived by four daughters and three sons, two of whom also practiced as architects.

Gallery

References

Further reading

External links
 Papers held at the University of Sydney

1827 births
1904 deaths
People from Arbroath
New South Wales architects
Australian public servants
Lighthouse builders